José Daniel Ferrer García (Palma Soriano, July 29, 1970) is a Cuban human rights activist, whom the international and Spanish media claim to be "the visible head of the dissident movement in the interior of the island since the death of Oswaldo Payá, in July 2012”.

As a member of the Christian Liberation Movement (MCL) in 2003, he was the oriental leader for collecting signatures among the Varela Project, in which 25,000 signatories petitioned the Cuban government to guarantee freedom of speech and freedom of assembly as well as institute a multi-party democracy. José Daniel got in prison in 2003 for his participation as a leader of the Varela Project, sentenced to 25 years. In prison from 2003 to 2011, he was declared a prisoner of conscience for the Black Spring of Cuba by Amnesty International.

Son of Daniel Ferrer and Amelia García, he has three children with his ex-wife Belkis Cantillo Ramírez: Martha Beatriz, José Daniel, Fátima Victoria.

He is the founder of the Patriotic Union of Cuba (UNPACU), which is an umbrella group that has hosted since 2011 many Cuban dissident organizations, a union that was extended with the merger of the Guillermo Fariñas organization in 2013, which was absorbed by UNPACU.

José Daniel Ferrer García was appointed in February 2013 Executive Secretary of the Patriotic Union of Cuba (UNPACU) by all members of the UNPACU and still remains as Executive Secretary.

However, years later, following the announcement of the reestablishment of Diplomatic relations between the Governments of the United States of America and Cuba, some organizations decided to separate in friendly terms and each return to their original organization, and so Jose Daniel Ferrer resumed in front of UNPACU, while between December 2014 and January 2015, Guillermo Farinas and Felix Navarro and their respective organizations left UNPACU.

Within the opposition to the Cuban government is characterized by its willingness, through the creation of sufficient "social mass" that "through non-violent struggle forces the government to sit at the negotiating table”, to achieve an "equal to equal and serious" dialogue in order to achieve the so-called "national reconciliation" and avoid any kind of "fraticide".

2003 arrest 
Ferrer was detained during the subsequent Black Spring crackdown of March 2003 and sentenced to 25 years' imprisonment for being one of the main promoters of the Varela Project. His brother Luis Enrique Ferrer García, also an MCL activist by then, was sentenced to 28 years. In May 2003, José Daniel  began a hunger strike after he was allegedly refused medical treatment for an intestinal issue. He was also subjected to punishment cells for refusing to stand in the presence of military or prison guards. The prison cells are reportedly and habitually below the international standard and the Standard Minimum Rules for the Treatment of Prisoners.

Amnesty International declared both Ferrer brothers to be prisoners of conscience. US President Barack Obama called for Ferrer's release in 2009, urging the Cuban government to allow him to "fully participate in a democratic future in Cuba."

Ferrer remained in prison until 2011. He and Félix Navarro Rodríguez were released on 23 March 2011 as part of an agreement between the Cuban government and the Catholic Church. They were the last two prisoners of the Black Spring to be released. Ferrer refused the option to emigrate to Spain, stating, "I want to see a free people, and the best place to fight is here inside."

Jail release 
José Daniel Ferrer received, like the rest of the prisoners of the Group called “the 75” (“Grupo de los 75”), the option of being released in exchange for leaving Cuba to Spain, due to the pressure of the international public opinion after the death in the prison of the political prisoner Orlando Zapata Tamayo, on February 23, 2010, and the following hunger strike of Guillermo Fariñas, who demanded that the Cuban government release the sick political prisoners.

But José Daniel was one of the 12 prisoners of conscience who assumed his sentence, and refused to be forced to leave Cuba for being released, and in 2011 he still remained in prison along with very few colleagues of the 75, being finally released by the Cuban government along with Félix Navarro Rodríguez, the last two prisoners of conscience of the Group of the 75 in prison, on March 22, 2011.

On August 24, 2011, already released from jail, and in Cuba, he created the Patriotic Union of Cuba (UNPACU).

Ferrer was detained again in April 2012 for "public disorder", and again for two days in August 2012 for his work with Unión Patriótica de Cuba (UNPACU). Amnesty International described the arrests as part of "a pattern of harassment by the Cuban authorities against UNPACU members and other political dissidents."

During the period of growth of the Patriotic Union of Cuba (UNPACU), and among numerous detentions of José Daniel Ferrer that were considered political by several reputed human rights organizations, the Patriotic Union of Cuba, on February 27, 2013, communicates the absorption of the peaceful dissident organization FANTU, one of the less numerous in the island but most notorious outside Cuba, led by then by Guillermo Fariñas, and also a multitude of other opposition organizations within the island through the integration of many of its most notorious leaders, including 8 of the 12 prisoners of conscience of the Group of 75 who decided to remain in Cuba. In the process of merging FANTU and UNPACU, Jose Daniel Ferrer and Guillermo Fariñas promulgated in a press note that the head of the new organization should be collegiate, stating "that their leadership will be collegially as a practical way to combat chieftainship".

José Daniel Ferrer García was appointed in February 2013 Executive Secretary of the Patriotic Union of Cuba (UNPACU) by all members of the UNPACU and still remains as Executive Secretary.

Travel discrimination 
Since his release from prison, José Daniel Ferrer has been refused by the Cuban Government, until only once in 2016, to travel abroad, under his condition of having an extrapenal license, despite the fact that other opposition personalities have been able to do so and that the government has informed that anyone with Cuban passport could travel outside the island, since in mid-October 2012 the decree amending the immigration law in Cuba, which previously made it difficult to travel outside the island, was made official.

Repression 
José Daniel Ferrer's himself and his relatives, including his wife and children, as well as other members of the Cuban Patriotic Union have received the support of Amnesty International and the World Organization against Torture on when arrested, robbed of their homes and retained in an unknown location after police detentions. The international pressure of several human rights organizations, such as Amnesty International and others, has on every occasion resulted in the release of José Daniel Ferrer.

Identified as a relevant personality of Cuban dissidence, having unified several organizations inside the Patriotic Union of Cuba (UNPACU), and identified this as the most active dissident organization throughout the island, both José Daniel Ferrer and the activists of the Patriotic Union of Cuba (UNPACU) have been threatened with imprisonment if they do not cease their political activism.

Recognition 
In 2009, Ferrer and fellow Cuban dissidents Librado Linares García, Iván Hernández Carrillo, Jorge Luis García Pérez, and Iris Pérez Aguilera were jointly awarded the Democracy Award of the US National Endowment for Democracy. Ferrer was unable to attend, as he was still in prison.

In 2011, he received the XIII International Award on Human Rights of the Cuban-Hispanic Foundation, in Madrid.

Spanish and Latin-american media claim him to be "the visible head of the dissident movement in the interior of the island since the death of Oswaldo Payá, in July 2012”.

Personal life 
Ferrer's wife, Cantillo Belkis Ramirez, is a member of the Ladies in White, a group of wives of political prisoners protesting every Sunday for their release. She was herself detained for 48 hours in March 2012.

References

External links 
 Official Page of the Patriotic Union of Cuba (UNPACU)
 Official YouTube Page of the Patriotic Union of Cuba (UNPACU)
 Official Facebook Page of the Patriotic Union of Cuba (UNPACU)
 Biography by CIDOB (in Spanish)

1970 births
Living people
Amnesty International prisoners of conscience held by Cuba
Cuban dissidents
Cuban prisoners and detainees
Hunger strikers
People from Santiago de Cuba